The non-marine molluscs of New Caledonia are a part of the molluscan fauna of New Caledonia.

Freshwater gastropods 

Hydrobiidae
 Hemistomia aquilonaris
 Hemistomia crosseana
 Hemistomia gorotitei
 Hemistomia lacinia
 Hemistomia napaia
 Hemistomia neku
 Hemistomia shostakovichi
 Hemistomia xaracuu
 Hemistomia yalayu
 Heterocyclus perroquini
 Heterocyclus petiti

Planorbidae
 Glyptophysa petiti Crosse, 1872

Land gastropods 

Draparnaudiidae

 Draparnaudia Montrouzier, 1859 – genus Draparnaudia is endemic to New Caledonia

Orthalicidae
 Leucocharis pancheri – endemic

Bothriembryontidae
 Placostylus eddystonensis Pfeiffer, 1855 – endemic
 Placostylus fibratus Martyn, 1789 – endemic
 Placostylus porphyrostomus Pfeiffer, 1851 – endemic

Freshwater bivalves

See also
 List of marine molluscs of New Caledonia
 List of non-marine molluscs of Australia
 List of non-marine molluscs of the Loyalty Islands

References

External links
 Dautzenberg P. (1923) "Mollusques terrestres de la Nouvelle-Calédonie et des îles Loyalty". 135–156. In: Sarasin F. & Roux J. (eds.) (1923). Nova Caledonia. Forschungen in Neu-Caledonien und auf den Loyalty-Inseln. Recherches scientifiques en Nouvelle-Calédonie et aux iles Loyalty. A. Zoologie Volume III.(1), C. D. Kriedel's Verlag.

Molluscs
Molluscs
New Caledonia
New Caledonia
New Caledonia